is a 2002 Japanese film directed by Takashi Koizumi. The film was adapted from the novel Amidadō Dayori written by Keishi Nagi. It stars Akira Terao. Letters from the Mountains was nominated for 13 awards at the 26th Japan Academy Film Prize.

The film depicts a couple moving from a big city to the countryside.

Cast

 Akira Terao as Takao Ueda
 Kanako Higuchi as Michiko Ueda
 Takahiro Tamura as Shignaga Kōda
 Kyōko Kagawa as Yone Kōda
 Hisashi Igawa as Sukeyaku Ishino
 Hidetaka Yoshioka as Doctor Nakamura
 Manami Konishi as Sayuri Ishino
 Tanie Kitabayashi as Oume

Honors

Japan Academy Film Prize
Won:Best Actress in a Supporting Role - Tanie Kitabayashi.
Won:Newcomer of the Year - Manami Konishi.

Blue Ribbon Awards
Won:Best Newcomer - Manami Konishi.

Mainichi Film Awards
Won:Best Music - Takashi Kako.

References

External links
Letters from the Mountains at Asmic Ace

2002 films
2000s Japanese-language films
Films based on Japanese novels
2000s Japanese films